Soctahoma Creek is a stream in the U.S. state of Mississippi.

Soctahoma is a name derived from the Choctaw language meaning "red streambank; red hillside", a name which was descriptively applied to this stream on account of the red clay near its course.

References

Rivers of Mississippi
Rivers of Chickasaw County, Mississippi
Mississippi placenames of Native American origin